Alessandro de Col was an Italian rower. He won four silver medals at European Rowing Championships between 1926 and 1930 in the double scull, all while teamed up with Michelangelo Bernasconi.

References

Year of birth missing
Year of death missing
Italian male rowers
European Rowing Championships medalists